Joni Gutierrez is an American politician who served as a member of the New Mexico House of Representatives from 2005 to 2013.

In 2012, Gutierrez decided against seeking re-election. She instead ran for and won a seat as the Democratic national committeewoman for New Mexico after the previous committeewoman, Mary Gail Gwaltney, decided to retire. Gutierrez is considered a potential future candidate for Congress in New Mexico's 2nd congressional district.

References

External links
 

Hispanic and Latino American state legislators in New Mexico
Hispanic and Latino American women in politics
Living people
Democratic Party members of the New Mexico House of Representatives
Year of birth missing (living people)
21st-century American women